Ralph Thomas O'Neil was the National Commander of The American Legion from 1930 to 1931.

References
"Automobiles & Underwear". Time, 5 March 1934.
"At Swords' Point". Time, 2 March 1936.

National Commanders of the American Legion